Locust Abortion Technician is the third full-length studio album by American rock band Butthole Surfers, released in March 1987. The album was originally released on both vinyl and CD on Touch and Go, and was remastered on CD on the band's label, Latino Buggerveil, in 1999.

Background
Locust Abortion Technician was the first Butthole Surfers album to not be recorded in a professional studio. After growing tired of living on the road, the band relocated to Winterville sometime in 1986, where they rented a small two-bedroom house, and used their meager savings to purchase an old Ampex 8-track tape machine and two microphones. Having set up a temporary home studio, the band set off to record what would become their third full-length LP. Despite the band downgrading from the equipment used on their previous record, guitarist Paul Leary believes that the inferior equipment forced the band to be more creative than they might otherwise have been.

Additionally, the new studio freed the band from having to worry about recording costs, allowing them to experiment even more than on previous releases. Jeff Pinkus has also said that the home studio gave them the luxury of taking extended breaks for drug use.

Many of the album's tracks also underwent extensive in-studio development. Although doing this had become a Butthole Surfers tradition, Locust Abortion Technician was one of their last recordings done in such a manner; on subsequent releases the band would go into the studio with more fully formed songs. Pinkus has expressed the opinion that the earlier, more chaotic recording sessions resulted in much of the spontaneous creativity that had propelled the group's early albums.

Music

Locust Abortion Technician is an experimental blend of punk rock, heavy metal, and psychedelic music. This fusion led the band to be associated with the emerging grunge and sludge metal sounds. It also employs elements of worldbeat rhythms, noise music, progressive guitar, and folk music, and has been described as art rock, noise rock and alternative metal.<ref>Christe, Ian (2003). Sound of the Beast: The Complete Headbanging History of Heavy Metal. HarperCollins. Chapter 13 Transforming the 1990s:
The Black Album & Beyond.</ref> The song "Sweat Loaf" utilizes a warped riff parodying the verse riff from the Black Sabbath song "Sweet Leaf". Not all the tracks are guitar-oriented, though; the song "Kuntz" was created by processing the song "Klua Duang" ("The Fear") by Thai artists Phloen Phromdaen and Kong Katkamngae through Gibby Haynes' "Gibbytronix" effects system. The song "22 Going On 23" is an early example of a song dealing directly with a woman's coping, or lack thereof, of sexual assault.

This album marked the debut of bass player Jeff Pinkus, as well as the return of co-drummer Teresa Nervosa, who had left the band in December 1985. It was also the first Surfers full-length album to feature lead singer Gibby Haynes' Gibbytronix vocal effects, which feature on the songs "Sweat Loaf" and "Human Cannonball" (though Gibbytronix were employed on "Comb" on the Cream Corn from the Socket of Davis EP a year earlier).

The Butthole Surfers regularly play songs from Locust Abortion Technician during their live concerts, including "Sweat Loaf", "Graveyard", "Pittsburgh to Lebanon", "U.S.S.A.", "Kuntz", and "22 Going on 23".

Notes
 "Sweat Loaf" is a take on the Black Sabbath song, "Sweet Leaf".
 "HAY" is a different mix of the "22 Going on 23" recording, played backwards at double speed. What sounds like voices saying "Hey!" in the song are, in fact, field recordings the band made of cows mooing outside a nearby slaughterhouse, also backwards at double speed.  In the final part, there is something that seems to be a high-pitched voice speaking gibberish. This is the speech from the beginning of "22 Going on 23," including the repeated words.
 "22 Going on 23" brought the band to wider UK attention when it was voted number 44 in John Peel's 1987 Festive Fifty.
 "The O-Men" is a spoof on the speed metal band Omen, inspired by and lifting its chorus from their song "Termination".

ArtworkLocust Abortion Technician's front cover illustration of two clowns playing with a dog, entitled "Fido and the Clowns," was painted by Arthur Sarnoff.

Reception and legacy

Steve Huey, reviewing the album for Allmusic, writes:

The aural equivalent of a nightmarish acid trip and arguably the band's best album (or worst, depending on your point of view), Locust Abortion Technician tops the psychedelic, artsy sonic experimentation of Rembrandt Pussyhorse while keeping one foot planted firmly in the gutter. The record veers from heavy Sabbath sludge (even parodying that band on "Sweat Loaf") to grungy noise rock to progressive guitar and tape effects to almost folky numbers in one big, gloriously schizophrenic mess.

The album received critical acclaim upon initial release, appearing in the year-end lists of noteworthy publications such as Melody Maker, NME and OOR. It would go on to feature in Robert Dimery's 1001 Albums You Must Hear Before You Die and Terrorizer magazine's "The 100 Most Important Albums of the 80s", while Alternative Press ranked it at #28 on their list of the "Top 99 Albums of '85 to '95". In 2018, Pitchfork included the album on their list of "The 200 Best Albums of the 1980s", writing:

From the John Wayne Gacy-indebted cover art to the turbid sounds within, the group’s third LP took a chainsaw to hardcore, psychedelic rock, country blues, Black Sabbath, and, on closer “22 Going on 23,” the sound of mooing cows and the agonizing confession of a sexual assault victim. Butchering every notion of good taste in their path, the Butthole Surfers revelled in the most cartoonish and nightmarish aspects of reality without regret.

Kurt Cobain listed it in his top 50 albums of all time. Doug Martsch included the album among the 10 records that shaped the music of his band Built to Spill.

Samples, covers and tributes
 "Sweat Loaf" is referenced in Red Hot Chili Peppers' song "Deep Kick" from their album One Hot Minute. The opening of "Sweat Loaf" was sampled by Orbital on their track "Satan".
 "Sweat Loaf" was sampled by Kid Rock on his track "Pancake Breakfast" from the album The Polyfuze Method.
 Melvins covered the track "Graveyard" on their 2018 album Pinkus Abortion Technician'', whose title is itself a reference to both this album and bassist Jeff Pinkus (who plays on both).

Track listing
All songs written and produced by Butthole Surfers, except where noted.
Side A

Side B

Personnel
 Gibby Haynes – lead vocals
 Paul Leary – guitar
 Jeff Pinkus – bass
 King Coffey – drums
 Teresa Nervosa – drums

Charts

References

External links

Locust Abortion Technician (Adobe Flash) at Radio3Net (streamed copy where licensed)

1987 albums
Butthole Surfers albums
Touch and Go Records albums
Blast First albums
Au Go Go Records albums
Songs about sexual assault